“Steppin' Out (Gonna Boogie Tonight)” is a 1974 song by the American pop music group Tony Orlando and Dawn. It was written by Irwin Levine (lyrics) and L. Russell Brown (music) and was included on the group's 1973 album, Dawn's New Ragtime Follies.

Chart performance

References

1974 singles
1973 songs
Tony Orlando songs
Bell Records singles
Songs written by L. Russell Brown
Songs written by Irwin Levine